Redcliff is a  mountain summit located in Hinsdale County, in southwest Colorado, United States. It is situated nine miles northeast of the town of Ouray, in the Uncompahgre Wilderness, on land managed by Uncompahgre National Forest. It is part of the San Juan Mountains which are a subset of the Rocky Mountains, and is situated west of the Continental Divide. Neighbors include Precipice Peak and Dunsinane Mountain along the west-middle Cimarron divide three miles to the north, and nearest higher neighbor Coxcomb Peak one-half mile to the south. An ascent of Redcliff involves 3,300 feet of elevation gain and 10 miles of hiking, round-trip. The mountain's name was proposed by the Colorado Mountain Club, and was officially adopted in 1966 by the United States Board on Geographic Names. It is so named because of a large reddish-colored cliff on the mountain's east face.

Climate 
According to the Köppen climate classification system, Redcliff is located in an alpine subarctic climate zone with cold, snowy winters, and cool to warm summers. Due to its altitude, it receives precipitation all year, as snow in winter, and as thunderstorms in summer, with a dry period in late spring. Precipitation runoff from the mountain drains into headwaters of both the west and middle forks of the Cimarron River.

See also

References

External links 
 Weather forecast: National Weather Service
 Redcliff photo: Flickr

Mountains of Hinsdale County, Colorado
San Juan Mountains (Colorado)
Mountains of Colorado
North American 4000 m summits
Uncompahgre National Forest